The huge moth family Noctuidae contains the following genera:

A B C D E F G H I J K L M N O P Q R S T U V W X Y Z

Badausa
Badiza
Baecula
Bagada
Bagisara
Ballonicha
Balsa
Bambusiphila
Bamra
Banassa
Bandelia
Baniana
Baniopis
Baorisa
Baptarma
Baputa
Barastrotia
Baratha
Barbesola
Barcita
Bareia
Bariana
Barrovia
Barybela
Basilica
Basilodes
Bastilla
Bathystolma
Bathytricha
Batina
Batracharta
Batuana
Batyma
Bavilia
Baxagha
Beckeugenia
Behounekia
Behrensia
Beihania
Belciades
Belciana
Bellura
Belosticta
Bematha
Bendis
Bendisodes
Bendisopis
Benjaminiola
Beregra
Berioana
Beriohansa
Beriotisia
Berocynta
Berresa
Berrhaea
Bertula
Bertulania
Bessacta
Bessula
Betusa
Biagicola
Biangulypena
Biareolifera
Bibacta
Bicondica
Bifrontipta
Bihymena
Biregula
Birtha
Bischoffia
Bistica
Bithiasa
Bithiga
Bityla
Blancharditia
Blanona
Blasticorhinus
Blemmatia
Blepharamia
Blepharita
Blepharoa
Blepharomima
Blepharonia
Blepharosis
Bleptina
Bleptinodes
Bleptiphora
Blosyris
Boalda
Bocana
Bocula
Boethanthia
Bolica
Bombotelia
Bombiciella
Bomolocha
Bompolia
Bonaberiana
Bononia
Borbotana
Bornolis
Borolia
Borsania
Borsippa
Boryza
Boryzola
Boryzops
Bostrodes
Bostrycharia
Bouda
Boursinania
Boursinia
Boursinidia
Bousinixis
Bracharthron
Brachionycha
Brachycosmia
Brachycyttara
Brachygalea
Brachyherca
Brachylomia
Brachyona
Brachypteragrotis
Brachytegma
Brachyxanthia
Bradunia
Brana
Brandtaxia
Brandticola
Brephos
Brevipecten
Briarda
Britha
Brithodes
Brithys
Brithysana
Brontypena
Brotis
Brunnarsia
Bryocodia
Bryogramma
Bryograpta
Bryoleuca
Bryolymnia
Bryomima
Bryomixis
Bryomoia
Bryonola
Bryonycta
Bryophila
Bryophilina
Bryopolia
Bryopsis
Bryotype
Bryotypella
Bryoxena
Buciara
Bucinna
Bulia
Bulna
Buphana
Burdettia
Burdria
Burgena
Busmadis
Busseola
Butleronea
Buzara
Byturna

References 

 Natural History Museum Lepidoptera genus database

 
Noctuid genera B